Just a Little Lovin' is a 2008 Dusty Springfield tribute album by Shelby Lynne.

Just a Little Lovin' may also refer to:

 "Just a Little Lovin' (Will Go a Long Way)", a 1948 song by Eddy Arnold
 "Just a Little Lovin, a 1968 song by Dusty Springfield from Dusty in Memphis, covered by several performers
 [[Just a Little Lovin' (Carmen McRae album)|Just a Little Lovin''' (Carmen McRae album)]], 1970
 "Just a Little Lovin, a song by Carmen Electra from Carmen Electra''